Linselles is a commune in the Nord department in northern France. It is part of the Métropole Européenne de Lille.

On 17 August 1793, during the War of the First Coalition, it was the site of the Battle of Lincelles, a victory for a combined British and Dutch force against those of Revolutionary France.

Population

Heraldry

See also
Communes of the Nord department

References

Communes of Nord (French department)
French Flanders